Lady in Blue is an oil on canvas painting by Paul Cézanne, executed , now in the Hermitage Museum in Saint Petersburg, Russia. 

One of Cézanne's last portraits of a woman, it shows the painter's governess Madame Brémond. Its tones, shapes and colours prefigure Fauvism and Cubism.

See also
List of paintings by Paul Cézanne

References

1904 paintings
Portraits by Paul Cézanne
Paintings in the collection of the Hermitage Museum
20th-century portraits
Portraits of women